Lorquon is a locality in western Victoria, Australia.

References

External links

Towns in Victoria (Australia)